Carpet cleaner or rug cleaner  may refer to:

 a product used in carpet cleaning
 Carpet beater
 Carpet sweeper